William Charles Henry Wood, (7 June 1864 – 2 September 1947) was a Canadian historian, Scout leader and naturalist. He was born in Quebec City and served in the Royal Rifles of Canada from 1887 to the end of the World War I achieving the rank of Lieutenant-Colonel. He was active in literary and history circles and served as President of the Quebec Literary and Historical Society. He was interested in nature conservation and advocated for bird sanctuaries in Labrador. He was also president of the scouts in Quebec in 1909. He was a prolific chronicler of Canadian history and wrote several books on the subject, most notably a five volume set on the history of Quebec entitled, The Storied Province of Quebec. He died in Quebec City in 1947 at the age of 83.  Wood was buried in Mount Hermon Cemetery in Sillery.

Background
Wood was born on 7 June 1864 in Quebec City. he was the son of George Augustus Leslie Wood, merchant, and Charlotte Feodore Louisa Augusta Guérout.

Selected works
 The Fight for Canada (1909), 
 The Loss of the Conquest of Canada (1909), 
 Tercentenial Quebec (1910), 
 One Sea, One Fleet (1910), 
 Animal Sanctuaries in Labrador Book of Canada (1911, with AG Doughty),
 In the Heart of Old Canada (1912), 
 All Afloat (1914), 
 The Passing of New France (1914), 
 The Great War of 1915 (1915)
 The War of the United States (1915), 
 Flags of the Civil War (1921), 
 Unique Quebec (1924), 
 The Winning of Freedom (1927), 
 In Defense of Liberty (1928), 
 The Storied Province of Quebec (in five volumes, 1931–32)

References

External links
 
 

1864 births
1947 deaths
Writers from Quebec City
Burials at Mount Hermon Cemetery
20th-century Canadian historians